Phyllis Neilson-Terry (15 October 1892 – 25 September 1977) was an English actress. She was a member of the third generation of the theatrical dynasty the Terry family. After early successes in the classics, including several leading Shakespearean roles, she spent more than four years in the US, in generally lightweight presentations.

Returning to England in 1919 she pursued a varied career, including cabaret, pantomime and variety as well as returning to Shakespeare and other classics. One of her last major roles was in Terence Rattigan's Separate Tables (1954) in which she played in the West End and on Broadway.

Biography

Early years
Neilson-Terry was born in London, the daughter of the actress Julia Neilson and her husband, the actor Fred Terry. The couple's other child was Phyllis's younger brother, Dennis, who also went on the stage. She was educated first at Westgate-on-Sea, and then in Paris, and after that at the Royal Academy of Music in London, where she studied to be a singer.

In 1909 Neilson-Terry made her first stage appearance, in her parents' stage company on tour in Blackpool; she played Marie de Belleforêt in Henry of Navarre, under the stage name Phillida Terson. The attempt to disguise her membership of the Terry dynasty was unsuccessful and the following year she abandoned it and reverted to her own name. 

Her London debut was in the same role, at the New Theatre in January 1910. The following month, when her mother was unwell, she took over the leading role of Marguerite de Valois. The drama critic of The Observer commented that her performance in such a heavy role "must be pronounced very promising indeed".

In April 1910, she played Viola in Twelfth Night in Sir Herbert Tree's company at His Majesty's in a cast that included Tree as Malvolio and her father as Viola's twin brother, Sebastian, a role he had formerly played to the Viola of his sister, Ellen. Her reviews were enthusiastic; The Observer said that expectations were extremely high but "she proved able to justify all, and more than all, the expectations which her effort had aroused," and The Times said that she "won everybody's heart from the first moment of her appearance. Tree, in a post-curtain speech, predicted that she would "add fresh honours to the honoured name of Terry for many a long year."

From 1910 to 1914, Neilson-Terry played a wide range of parts; in the classics her roles included Rosalind in As You Like It (1911), Juliet in Romeo and Juliet, Desdemona in Othello and Portia in The Merchant of Venice (all 1912). She also appeared in modern plays, including a revival of Trilby opposite Tree's Svengali. She continued to play the role in revivals in many parts of the world in later years.

In 1914, she went to the US, and, having signed a long-term contract, did not return to Britain until 1919. In America she reprised her Trilby, appeared in vaudeville giving songs, recitations and excerpts from Shakespeare, and played Nora Marsh in Somerset Maugham's The Land of Promise.

Later career

In the Oxford Dictionary of National Biography J C Trewin wrote that it was "unfortunate" that Fred Terry seldom extended himself by taking the great classic roles for which his talent fitted him. The Times's obituarist of Terry's daughter made a similar point about her, commenting that after returning from the US she did not regain the outstanding position she had won for herself as a young actress. As in America, she toured with light variety programmes, and in ephemeral crowd-pleasing plays. Among the latter was The Wheel by J B Fagan, in which she gave her young cousin John Gielgud his first paid acting role, in 1922.

During the 1920s Neilson-Terry toured in South Africa, and appeared in Britain in a range of performance from cabaret to pantomime at Drury Lane. She played in Shakespeare at the Open Air Theatre, Regent's Park and on tour with Donald Wolfit. In the 1930s she played Lady Macbeth and Queen Katherine in Henry VIII at the Shakespeare Memorial Theatre, Stratford-upon-Avon. In Gielgud's view, her most notable role of the inter-war years was Queen Elizabeth in Ferdinand Bruckner's Elizabeth of England: "In this play she showed unexpected tragic power in the scene in which Essex bursts into her presence to find her wigless and dishevelled."

During the 1940s her roles included Miss Moffat in The Corn is Green in which Gielgud said she acted "with undiminished grace." In the 1950s her most notable role was Mrs Railton-Bell, the tyrannical matriarch in Rattigan's Separate Tables. She later played the role on Broadway. Her final stage performances were as Lady Bletchley in Frederick Lonsdale's Let Them Eat Cake (1959) and Lady Godolphin in Robert Kemp's Off a Duck's Back (1960).

Personal life 
Neilson-Terry was twice married. Both her husbands were actors: Cecil King and Heron Carvic. She died in London at the age of 84.

Filmography
 Trilby; (1915 Hollywood version, directed by Maurice Tourneur; not the 1914 British version starring Tree). 
 The Call of the Blood (1921, Western film) as Hermione Lester
 Tense Moments with Great Authors (1922, Short) as Trilby
 Boadicea (1927) as Queen Boadicea
 One Family (1930, British Empire film) as 'Australia'
 Rx Murder (1958) as Lady Lacy
 The Enchanted April (1958, ITV Play of the Week) as Mrs Fisher
 Ivanhoe (1958, TV Series) as Queen Eleanor
 Pride and Prejudice (1958, TV series) as Lady Catherine de Bourgh
 Look Back in Anger (1959) as Mrs. Redfern
 Conspiracy of Hearts (1960) as Sister Elizaveta (final film role)

See also
 Terry family
 Neilson-Terry Guild of Dramatic Art

Notes

References

External links

Phyllis Neilson-Terry
Image of Phyllis Neilson-Terry
Phyllis Neilson-Terry colour lithograph 1915 The Theatre magazine

1892 births
1977 deaths
Actresses from London
English film actresses
English silent film actresses
English stage actresses
English Shakespearean actresses
20th-century English actresses
Terry family